Ellen Louise Maggs (born 16 February 1983) is an English former international footballer. As well as the England women's national football team, Maggs played FA Women's Premier League football for clubs including Birmingham City, Watford and Arsenal. Often described as diminutive, Maggs operated as a quick, skilful and creative forward.

Club career
Maggs joined Arsenal Ladies as a nine-year-old, after being spotted at an after school football course. On seeing Maggs for the first time, Arsenal manager Vic Akers informed her father that she would one day play for England. Having grown up in nearby Islington, Maggs was already an Arsenal supporter. Aged 17, she came on as a substitute in Arsenal's 4–1 FA Women's Premier League Cup final win over Croydon in April 2000.

When Marieanne Spacey left Arsenal for Fulham in 2002, Maggs was elevated into regular first team contention. Two goals against Fulham in the televised FA Women's Community Shield underscored Maggs' potential, but minor injuries disrupted her 2002–03 campaign. After a further season at Arsenal, in which Maggs scored the League–clinching goal, Marcus Bignot signed her for his ambitious Birmingham City team in August 2004.

Maggs joined American W-League club New York Magic in June 2006, along with Birmingham teammate Laura Bassett.

In September 2006 Maggs signed for FA Women's Premier League Southern Division club Watford, managed by her former Arsenal teammate Sian Williams. She was paired in attack with Helen Lander, who later stated:  

In 2008–09 Maggs turned out for Welwyn Garden City and Haringey Borough.

International career
Maggs represented England at the 2002 FIFA U-19 Women's World Championship in Canada. A FIFA.com article said of Maggs: 

She was called into the senior England squad for the first time in November 2002, when Arsenal teammate Kirsty Pealling pulled out of the World Cup qualifying play–off second leg against France.

On 19 May 2003 Maggs made her senior debut, as a 66th-minute substitute for Amanda Barr in a 4–0 defeat to Canada during a tour of North America. A second appearance came in October 2003, during a 2–2 draw in Russia.

A 2–0 friendly win over Denmark at Fratton Park in February 2004 was Maggs' first start for England. In September 2004 she featured as a substitute in another friendly, a 1–0 win over the Netherlands in Tuitjenhorn. In January 2005 Maggs was recalled to a 30–player training squad for the annual trip to La Manga Club. She missed out on selection for UEFA Women's Euro 2005 but was called into the national Under 21 squad for the Nordic Cup in July 2005.

References

1983 births
Living people
English women's footballers
Arsenal W.F.C. players
Birmingham City W.F.C. players
Watford F.C. Women players
FA Women's National League players
England women's international footballers
England women's under-23 international footballers
Women's association football forwards